Third World Girl may refer to:

Third World Girl, album by Avion Blackman (2011)
"Third World Girl", tribute song to Bob Marley by Marvin Gaye from Midnight Love
"Third World Girl", song by Ten Foot Pole from Swill (1993)
Third World Girl: Selected Poems, by Jean "Binta" Breeze (2011)